The East Branch Oyster River is a tributary of the Oyster River in Knox County, Maine. 

See also 
 List of rivers of Maine

References 

 Maine Streamflow Data from the USGS
 Maine Watershed Data From Environmental Protection Agency

Rivers of Knox County, Maine
Rockland, Maine
Rivers of Maine